Ralph Frederick Peo (May 3, 1897 – November 29, 1966) was an American inventor, engineer, business executive in the automobile industry, and the holder of 150 patents. He was founder of Frontier Industries in Buffalo, New York and was CEO of Houdaille Industries from 1955 to 1962 and chairman of the board from 1956 to 1964. A pioneer in the development of the automobile shock absorber, Peo invented the first thermostatically controlled shock absorber.  He also invented one of the earliest air conditioners for use in automobiles.

Early life
Peo was born in Rochester, New York, the oldest of three sons of Julien Frederick Peo and Flora (VanSchaick) Peo.  The Peo family had come to America from France in 1832 and settled in Jefferson County, New York. The French spelling of the family surname was Peillot. His father encouraged him to work creatively with his hands. He had a workshop with many valuable tools in the basement of their home on Richard Street, Rochester.  He attended Rochester Public School No. 15 and The Mechanics Institute of Rochester where he graduated in 1915 with a mechanical engineering degree.

Career
After college, he went to Detroit, Michigan to gain experience in the automobile industry. In Detroit he worked for Oakland, Dodge and Ford Motor Companies.  He became acquainted with Charles F. Kettering of General Motors, who he regarded as the greatest American inventor in the automotive field. He worked in the Detroit auto industry for nine years until 1924 when he relocated to Buffalo, New York to become the assistant chief engineer at the American Radiator Company. In October 1927 Henry Ford wrote to A.B. Schultz, president of the Houde Engineering Corporation of Buffalo, manufactures of Houdaille shock absorbers. Ford told Schultz that if he hired 30 year old Peo to supervise production at the Buffalo plant, then Ford would install Houdaille shock absorbers on every Ford automobile manufactured. Houde Engineering was acquired by the Houdaille-Hershey Corporation and Peo became Executive Vice President of Houdaille-Hershey and president of the Buffalo Division.

During World War II he continued to manage the Buffalo Houdaille operations as well as the Buffalo Arms, Incorporated, a newly formed subsidiary of Houdaille-Hershey, which manufactured machine guns. He was known to be a production wizard.  His motto was "get it done".

After WWII, he resigned from Houdaille and formed Frontier Industries by putting together a group of four diversified manufacturing companies, Buffalo Arms,  Buffalo Crushed Stone, Fairmount Tool and Forging Company of Cleveland, Ohio, and Manzel Brothers, manufactures of lubricating machines.

In 1955 Frontier Industries merged with Detroit-based Houdaille-Hershey.  Peo became CEO, the corporate name was changed to Houdaille Industries and the corporate headquarters was moved to Buffalo.

By the end of 1961 Peo had developed Houdaille into a national business leader in the construction materials, automotive parts, and industrial tools & machinery industries with over $80 million in annual sales, over 60 business locations in the United States and Canada and 9,783 shareholders. Peo retired as CEO in 1962 and continued as Chairman of the Board until 1964, when he became Chairman Emeritus.

Personal life
Peo was an avid gardener. At one time he cultivated over 100,000 tulips in his garden at his Buffalo home. He also had a life long passion for boating.  In his youth he would paddle a small boat along the shores of Lake Ontario, near Rochester, and sing to onlookers to earn spending money. As an adult, he purchased larger watercraft, the largest, a 60 foot yacht named HI Lady (for Houdaille Industries). Later in life he owned a 50+ foot Hatteras yacht named the BarBeth IV (for his daughters). In 1917 Peo married Magdeline Heath who died in 1942 at age 48.  They had one son, Jack Heath Peo (1919–1968).  In 1943 he married Ethelmay Brent (1909–1971) and they had two daughters. He died in Buffalo on November 29, 1966.

Awards, honors and community activities
 1955 University of Buffalo outstanding businessman of the Niagara Frontier
 1957 Rochester Institute of Technology alumnus of the year
 Chairman of the Board of the New York Higher Education Assistance Corporation
 Chairman of the Buffalo Branch of the Federal Reserve Bank of New York

Patents
  Hydraulic Shock Absorber, Issued: November 11, 1930
  Hydraulic Shock Absorber, Issued: March 31, 1931
  Hydraulic Shock Absorber, Issued: April 5, 1932
  Automobile Shock Absorber, Issued: October 11, 1932
  Thermostatic valve for Shock Absorber, Issued: October 11, 1932
  Joint for Automobile, Issued: October 11, 1932
  Coupling for Moving Members, Issued: October 11, 1932
  Sway prevention device, Issued: October 11, 1932
  Hydraulic Shock Absorber, Issued: October 25, 1932
  Shifting Device, Issued: April 25, 1933
  Hydraulic Shock Absorber, Issued: May 23, 1933
  Hydraulic Shock Absorber, Issued: August 1, 1933
  Controller for Shock Absorbers, Issued: October 10, 1933
  Hydraulic Shock Absorber, Issued: November 28, 1933
  Method of Making Pistons for Shock Absorbers, Issued: December 26, 1933
  Hydraulic Shock Absorber, Issued: June 19, 1934
  Hydraulic Shock Absorber, Issued: June 11, 1935
  Hydraulic Shock Absorber, Issued: June 11, 1935
  Hydraulic Shock Absorber, Issued: June 11, 1935
  Hydraulic Shock Absorber, Issued: June 11, 1935
  Hydraulic Shock Absorber, Issued: June 18, 1935
  Link, Issued: June 18, 1935
  Hydraulic Shock Absorber, Issued: June 25, 1935
  Thermostatic valve Structure for Hydraulic Shock Absorbers, Issued: June 25, 1935
  Individual Wheel Suspension, Issued: November 5, 1935
  Valve Mechanism, Issued: November 19, 1935
  Hydraulic Shock Absorber, Issued: November 19, 1935
  Hydraulic Shock Absorber, Issued: January 21, 1936
  Link Assembly, Issued: April 7, 1936
  Hydraulic Shock Absorber, Issued: April 21, 1936
  Hydraulic Shock Absorber, Issued: April 21, 1936
  Hydraulic Shock Absorber, Issued: April 28, 1936
  Individual Wheel Suspension, Issued: April 28, 1936
  Hydraulic Shock Absorber, Issued: April 28, 1936
  Hydraulic Shock Absorber, Issued: June 9, 1936
  Hydraulic Shock Absorber, Issued: June 9, 1936
  Hydraulic Shock Absorber, Issued: September 15, 1936
  Hydraulic Shock Absorber, Issued: September 15, 1936
  Automatic Tire Inflation Attachment, Issued: September 29, 1936
  Hydraulic Shock Absorber, Issued: December 8, 1936
  Joint, Issued: January 5, 1937
  Bearing Sleeve and Joint Assembly, Issued: April 20, 1937
  Deflector for Automotive Vehicles, Issued: April 20, 1937
  Thermostatic Valve Assembly, Issued: May 11, 1937
  Valving Assembly for Hydraulic Shock Absorbers, Issued: July 6, 1937
  Valving Assembly for Hydraulic Shock Absorbers, Issued: August 10, 1937
  Valving Assembly for Hydraulic Shock Absorbers, Issued: August 10, 1937
  Valving Assembly for Hydraulic Shock Absorbers, Issued: August 10, 1937
  Link, Issued: August 24, 1937
  Connecting Link, Issued: October 12, 1937
  Valving Assembly for Hydraulic Shock Absorbers, Issued: October 19, 1937
  Joint, Issued: October 19, 1937
  Air Cooling Unit for Automobile Vehicles, Issued: November 16, 1937
  Valving Assembly for Hydraulic Shock Absorbers, Issued: November 30, 1937
  Governor Clutch, Issued: February 8, 1938
  Automobile Air Conditioning System, Issued: May 3, 1938
  Air Conditioning Evaporator, Issued: May 10, 1938
  Link, Issued: July 5, 1938
  Link Assembly, Issued: August 9, 1938
  Oil Separator for Evaporators, Issued: December 6, 1938
  Hydraulic Shock Absorber Valve Structure, Issued: December 13, 1938
  Refrigerating System, Issued: June 13, 1939
  Dry Ice Air Conditioning Unit for Vehicles, Issued: June 13, 1939
  Dry Ice Air Conditioner, Issued: September 5, 1939
  Hydraulic Shock Absorber, Issued: September 19, 1939
  Air Conditioning System for Automobiles, Issued: November 21, 1939
  Roof Mounted Air Conditioner, Issued: December 5, 1939
  Link Assembly, Issued: December 26, 1939
  Hydraulic Shock Absorber, Issued: March 19, 1940
  Independent Wheel Suspension, Issued: June 4, 1940
  Hydraulic Shock Absorber, Issued: September 23, 1941
  Hydraulic Shock Absorber, Issued: November 4, 1941
  Control Device for Refrigerating Systems, Issued: February 17, 1942
  Thermostatic Bypass Valve, Issued: November 10, 1942

References

1897 births
1966 deaths
People from Rochester, New York
Rochester Institute of Technology alumni
Burials at Forest Lawn Cemetery (Buffalo)
Businesspeople from Buffalo, New York
American industrialists
20th-century American inventors
20th-century American engineers
People in the automobile industry
20th-century American businesspeople
American chairpersons of corporations